The Icelandic Women's Basketball Company Cup, commonly known as the  Women's Company Cup (Icelandic: Fyrirtækjabikar kvenna), was an annual basketball competition between clubs in Iceland that was organized by the Icelandic Basketball Federation. It was Iceland's second-tier cup competition, and is not to be confused with Iceland's first-tier cup competition, the Icelandic Cup.

History and format
The Company Cup was founded in 2000 and its first edition, bearing the name Kjörísbikarinn after its sponsor Kjörís, took place in December that year. It included all five Úrvalsdeild kvennaa teams and three teams from the second-tier 1. deild kvenna, with Keflavík, KFÍ, KR and ÍS advancing to the final four. Keflavík and KR went on to the Cup final where KR won 48-34.

Its last edition to date was held in 2015 where Haukar defeated Keflavík in the Cup finals, 47-70.

Title holders 

 2000 KR 
 2001 Grindavík   
 2002 Keflavík 
 2003 Keflavík 
 2004 Keflavík 
 2005 Haukar 
 2006 Haukar 
 2007 Keflavík 
 2008 Keflavík 
 2009 KR 
 2010 Keflavík 
 2011 Haukar  
 2012 Snæfell 
 2013 Valur 
 2014 Keflavík 
 2015 Haukar 

Source

See also
Icelandic Basketball Federation
Úrvalsdeild kvenna
Icelandic Basketball Cup
Icelandic Basketball Supercup
Icelandic Division I

References

External links
 Icelandic Basketball Federation 
 History of the Company Cup finals 

2000 establishments in Iceland
Woen
Basketball cup competitions in Europe
Recurring sporting events established in 2000